Adish Mammadov Sakit oglu (born on December 17, 1968) is a scientist, diplomat and the Ambassador Extraordinary and Plenipotentiary of the Republic of Azerbaijan to the Kingdom of Sweden between 2013-2018

Early life and education

Mammadov was born on December 17, 1968, in the Seyidbazar village of the Jalilabad region of Azerbaijan. In 1986 he finished the secondary school with a silver medal and entered the faculty of Mechanics-mathematics of the Baku State University. Mammadov graduated the university with honors in 1991 and started his postgraduate study (Aspirantura) with the academic direction of Mathematical Analysis at the same university. In 1995, he defended his candidacy dissertation and was conferred the academic degree of candidate of sciences (PhD). After the graduation, he started to work as a lecturer and later senior lecturer at the Department of Mathematical Analysis of the Baku State University from 1995 to 1998. In 2002, he entered the Faculty of International Relations and International Law at the Baku State University, and in 2005, graduated the said university with distinction.

In 2012, he started his doctoral studies, leading to the awarding of the degree of Doctor of Political Science, at the Institute of Philosophy and Law of the Azerbaijan National Academy of Sciences, and currently working on his thesis titled “Political and legal aspects of settlement of internal conflicts.”

Political career

Adish Mammadov started his political career in 1998 as an adviser in the Department of Humanitarian Politics of the Presidential Administration of Azerbaijan Republic. He was retained in his post until 2000, when at the same year he was appointed first secretary to the Ministry of Foreign Affairs of Azerbaijan. In 2001-2002, he was the Chief of the Department of Central Asia at the MFA. From 2002 to 2005, he served as First Secretary at the Embassy of the Republic of Azerbaijan to  the Islamic Republic of Iran. In 2005-2013, he worked as a Counselor in the Ministry of Foreign Affairs. On August 12, 2013, he was appointed the Ambassador Extraordinary and Plenipotentiary of the Republic of Azerbaijan to the Kingdom of Sweden by Ilham Aliyev, President of the Republic of Azerbaijan. He is the second Azerbaijani Ambassador to the Kingdom of Sweden.

Personal life

Adish Mammadov is married and father of two children. Other than his native language-Azerbaijani, he speaks English, Russian, Persian and Turkish.

Bibliography

Adish Mammadov is the author of two books on International Relations and several articles published in local and foreign papers.

Dictionary of Diplomacy/Baku: QAPP-POLIQRAF NPK, 2001
International Conflicts/International Conflicts.- Baku: Təhsil, 2002

1968 births
Living people
Ambassadors of Azerbaijan to Sweden
Baku State University alumni
Academic staff of Baku State University